Major General Beaumont Bonaparte Buck (January 16, 1860 – February 10, 1950) was a United States Army officer who served in the Spanish–American War, the Philippine–American War, and World War I. He is best known for his service with the 1st Division during World War I, where he commanded a regiment, brigade and division.

Early life
Beaumont Bonaparte Buck was born on January 16, 1860, in Mayhew, Mississippi, to James and Martha Garner Buck. He entered the United States Military Academy (USMA) at West Point, New York, from where he graduated thirty of thirty-nine with the class of 1885. His classmates included Willard A. Holbrook, Robert A. Brown, Robert Michie, Daniel B. Devore, Henry P. McCain, Joseph E. Kuhn, Charles H. Muir, John D. Barrette, John M. Carson Jr., William F. Martin, George W. Burr and Robert Lee Bullard. All of these men would, like Buck himself, attain the rank of general officer.

Military career
After graduation, Buck was commissioned as a second lieutenant in the United States Army Infantry Branch. His first assignment was with the 16th Infantry Regiment and served on frontier duty from 1885 to 1889. After completing a brief tour of duty in the Philippines, he returned to the United States to serve as commandant of cadets at Baylor University from 1893 to 1894. Upon the outbreak of the Spanish–American War in 1898, Buck entered the Second Texas Volunteer Infantry as a major and was honorably mustered out of the unit at the end of the war. On March 1, 1899, Buck was promoted to captain and became commandant of cadets at the University of Missouri, a position he held until 1902. During this period he completed three separate tours of duty in the Philippines during the Philippine–American War and married his wife Susanne Long on December 30, 1908. In 1914, Buck was promoted to the rank of colonel and sent to the US–Mexican border. A year later, he joined the Massachusetts National Guard.

On June 12, 1917, just over two months after the American entry into World War I, Buck became the commanding officer (CO) of the 28th Infantry Regiment which, together with the 26th Infantry Regiment and the 3rd Machine Gun Battalion, formed part of the 2nd Brigade, itself part of the newly created 1st Division under Major General William L. Sibert, which was soon sent to France as part of the first contingent of the American Expeditionary Forces (AEF). Buck was promoted to the rank of brigadier general on August 5 and succeeded Robert Lee Bullard, a West Point classmate of 1885, in command of the 2nd Brigade. Buck went on to lead the brigade during the battles of Cantigny and Soissons in the spring and summer of 1918. Buck was awarded the Distinguished Service Cross (DSC) for his role in the capture of Berzy-le-Sec during the battle of Soissons. The citation for his DSC reads:

Buck was rewarded for his performance by receiving a promotion to the rank of major general on August 8, 1918, and went on to succeed Joseph T. Dickman in command of the 3rd Division, while Frank E. Bamford took over command of Buck's old 2nd Brigade. Under Buck's command, the 3rd Division fought in the Battle of Saint-Mihiel in mid-September, and then soon afterwards in the Meuse–Argonne offensive, where Buck apparently did not perform well and was relieved of his command by General John J. Pershing, Commander-in-Chief (C-in-C) of the AEF. On October 15, at the height of the battle, Pershing visited Buck's 3rd Division headquarters, then at Montfaucon, where "he found the troops mixed, disorganized, and apparently disheartened" and, concluding that Buck was not up to the job of commanding a division (despite having performed very well in command of a regiment and a brigade), made the decision to replace him. Buck was not the only commander to be relieved during the battle, however, as Pershing also relieved Major General John E. McMahon, commanding the 5th Division, and Clarence R. Edwards, commanding the 26th "Yankee" Division, in the same month, for similar reasons. Buck's replacement went to a much younger man, Brigadier General Preston Brown, who replaced him on October 18.

After this, Buck, very briefly, in late October assumed command of the 34th Division, which had only recently arrived in France but had been skeletonized and stripped of most of its personnel to provide replacements for other divisions in the AEF. The Armistice with Germany occurred soon afterwards, on November 11, 1918, bringing the war to an end.

Buck returned to the United States on November 15, where he took command of Camp MacArthur in December and Camp Meade in March 1919. From May 1919 to March 1920 he was assigned to the Mexican–American border near Laredo, Texas, later transferring to Fort Crook in April 1920. His final assignment was as acting chief of staff of the 90th Division Organized Reserves at Camp Travis (now part of Fort Sam Houston) on August 15, 1921.

In retirement
Buck retired from military service as a colonel in 1924, moving to San Antonio, Texas. His full rank was restored by Congress in June 1930, and he published a memoir, entitled Memories of Peace and War, in 1935.

Death and legacy
Buck spent his final years in San Antonio, Texas, where he died on February 10, 1950, at the age of 90, and was buried in Fort Sam Houston National Cemetery.

References

Bibliography

External links

|-

1860 births
1950 deaths
Recipients of the Distinguished Service Cross (United States)
Recipients of the Croix de Guerre (France)
United States Army generals of World War I
Recipients of the War Merit Cross (Italy)
United States Military Academy alumni
United States Army generals
Burials at Fort Sam Houston National Cemetery
American military personnel of the Spanish–American War
American military personnel of the Philippine–American War
Military personnel from Mississippi
Baylor University faculty
University of Missouri faculty